Dead Celebrity Status is a Canadian rap rock group originating in Sudbury, Ontario. Rappers Yas Taalat and Bobby McIntosh, both former members of the nu metal band Project Wyze, teamed up with onetime DMC World Champion DJ Dopey to form Dead Celebrity Status in 2003.

History

Following the breakup of Project Wyze, Taalat and McIntosh began writing and recording new material under a new label, Bodog Music. Dead Celebrity Status had been created, but the MCs felt that there was a missing component. They called upon DJ Dopey, an internationally renowned DJ, to complete the group.

They partnered with producer Danny Saber, who has worked with acts like The Rolling Stones, U2, and Busta Rhymes.
Saber's connections allowed the group to feature high-profile artists on their debut album, Blood Music, which was released in 2006. The album features collaborations with artists such as Joss Stone, Dave Navarro, Stephen Perkins, Bif Naked, Twiggy Ramirez, Limore Twena and DJ Lethal. "We Fall, We Fall" was the first single from the album.
The track features the guitar talents of Dave Navarro and the lyrics address unreal expectations from pop culture and the music industry. "Messiah," a track from Blood Music, was featured on the soundtrack of the 2005 film XXX: State of the Union.

Dead Celebrity Status was one of the acts featured in the 2006 North American Warped Tour. They were the opening act for Tech N9ne’s American tour in 2007.

DCS announced on their website that their second album was scheduled to be released on August 6, 2013.

As of July 2019 their official website was no longer active.

Discography
Blood Music (2004)
The Throwaway Kids (2013)

References

External links
 MySpace Profile
 Much Music Biography
 PunkTV.ca Interview with Yas

Canadian hip hop groups
Rap rock groups
Canadian musical duos
Musical groups from Greater Sudbury
Musical groups from London, Ontario
Musical groups established in 2003
2003 establishments in Ontario